Andreas G. Heiss is an Austrian archaeobotanist and research group leader at the Austrian Archaeological Institute at the Austrian Academy of Sciences. Originally from Schwaz, Tyrol, he studied at the University of Innsbruck (Master's degree, 2003; Doctorate, 2008) and the University of Natural Resources and Life Sciences, Vienna (Habilitation, 2020).

References

External links

 Staff profile at the Austrian Archaeological Institute (OeAI) at the Austrian Academy of Sciences (OeAW)
 Profile on ResearchGate
 

1978 births
People from Schwaz
Archaeobotanists
University of Innsbruck alumni
Living people